Sam Leak is an English, London-based jazz pianist, best known for his albums Places, on Jellymould Jazz, and Aquarium, on the Babel Label.
His band 'Aquarium,' with saxophonist James Allsopp, double bassist Calum Gourlay, and drummer Joshua Blackmore, have been described by BBC Music Magazine as playing "assured and sophisticated acoustic jazz with deep roots in the tradition, that knows exactly what it's trying to do, and succeeds." Mojo describe them as: "Multi-faceted and smart as a pin, this is poetic chamber jazz of a very high order."

Lecturer in Music
Leak is a lecturer in Popular Music at Middlesex University.

Education
Leak studied Jazz piano with Gwilym Simcock at the Royal Academy of Music. Leak is currently a PhD candidate at the University of Cambridge, where he is researching the learnability of Absolute Pitch by adults.

Discography
As leader:

 Aquarium - Aquarium (Babel Label 2011)
 Places - Aquarium (Jellymould Jazz 2013)

As sideman

 In Bad Company - Filipe Monteiro (Filipe Monteiro 2012)
 Road Ahead - Mark Perry and Duncan Eagles Quintet (F-ire Presents 2013)
 Seven Deadly Sings - Louise Gibbs (33 Jazz 2014)
 Ghetto - The Spike Orchestra (Spike Records 2014)
 John Zorn - The Spike Orchestra – Cerberus: The Book of Angels Volume 26 - The Spike Orchestra (Tzadik 2015)
 Simians of Swing - Simians of Swing (Coffee and Apple Records 2016)
 Gathering - Chris Rand (Dot Time Records 2016)
 Ask, Seek, Knock - Samuel Eagles and Spirit (Whirlwind Recordings 2017)

References

External links
 

Year of birth missing (living people)
Living people
English jazz pianists
Alumni of the Royal Academy of Music
21st-century pianists